Slitrig Water (archaic Scots: Slitterick Waiter; current Southern Scots: Slitrig Witter), also known as the River Slitrig, is a river in the Scottish Borders. It is a tributary of the River Teviot.

References

Rivers of the Scottish Borders
2Slitrig